Indian Institute of Management Calcutta (IIM Calcutta or IIM-C) is a public business school located in Joka, Kolkata, West Bengal, India. It was the first Indian Institute of Management to be established, and has been recognized as an Institute of National Importance by the Government of India in 2017. Programmes offered by IIM Calcutta include a two-year full-time MBA,a one-year full-time Post Graduate Diploma(PGPEX-VLM), a one-year MBA for experienced executives, Doctor of Business Administration programme, a two-year full-time Post Graduate Diploma in Business Analytics, and a one-year full-time programme in Healthcare Management. IIM Calcutta is one of only three triple accredited business schools in India, and the first to get the recognition. It is also the only business school in India which is a part of the CEMS Global Alliance in Management Education.

History
After India became independent in 1947, the Planning Commission was entrusted to oversee and direct the development of the nation. India proliferated in the 1950s, and in the late 1950s, the Commission started facing difficulties in finding suitable managers for the large number of public sector enterprises that were being established in India as a part of its industrial policy. To solve this problem, the Planning Commission in 1959 invited Professor George Robbins of the University of California to help in setting up an all India level institute of management studies. Based on his recommendations, the Indian government decided to set up two elite management institutes, named Indian Institutes of Management.

Indian Institute of Management Calcutta was the first of these IIMs, and was established in November 1961 in collaboration with the MIT Sloan School of Management, the government of West Bengal, the Ford Foundation and the Indian industry. Its first director was K. T. Chandy, the former Chairman of Hindustan Unilever Limited. During the initial years of IIM Calcutta, several renowned academics and visionaries formed part of its core team, including Paul Samuelson, Jagdish Sheth, J K Sengupta, Peter S King, and Thomas Hill.

In its initial years, IIM Calcutta operated from Emerald Bower, Barrackpur Trunk Road, Kolkata. The foundation stone of the current IIM-C campus in Joka, Kolkata, was laid by Morarji Desai, who was then the Deputy Prime Minister of India on 15 Dec 1968. The institute moved to the new campus in 1975.

Campus
The main campus of IIM Calcutta, covering  of area, is located in Joka, on the outskirts of Kolkata, India. The institute moved to its present campus in 1975.

On written request of IIM Calcutta, dated Dec 23rd 2019, seeking for land for another campus, Government of West Bengal allotted 5 acres of prime land in New Town, Kolkata

Corporate placement and campus drive 
IIM Calcutta provides vide network of corporate placement opportunities for its students and recently collaborated internationally for exploring students dynamics for international experience. The collaboration happened in December 2021 includes with TreeAndHumanKnot RisingIndia ThinkTank

Teaching Blocks
IIM Calcutta's main Academic Block is situated next to the main administrative building and has four large lecture halls and several additional classrooms. Another academic building named New Teaching Block was opened in 2000 to supplement the main block. A new Academic Block has also been constructed and was declared open by the then Prime Minister of India, Dr. Manmohan Singh in August 2011.

Auditorium
The Auditorium at IIM Calcutta, popularly called the Audi, hosts most of the important functions in the campus like the convocation, conferences, student events and talks. It is fully air-conditioned and is equipped with ultra-modern equipment including professional audio and visual systems.

Library
The IIM-C library is named Bidhan Chandra Roy Library or BC Roy Memorial Library, after Bidhan Chandra Roy, the second Chief Minister of the state of West Bengal and the first chairman of the institute. The library is primarily envisioned to meet the requirements of the IIM-C's academic programmes. It was started with a grant from the Ford Foundation. It houses over 160,000 volumes and also subscribes to hundreds of management journals and provides access to a large collection of electronic databases. The library processes and functions are fully computerized and in addition to print material, it provides access to more than 40,000 online full-text journals.

Management Center for Human Values
The Management Center for Human Values (MCHV) is located in separate buildings in a part of the campus.

Hostels & Accommodation
IIM-C has 4 main hostels for students pursuing its PGDM, PGDCM and Fellow programmes – Ramanujan Hostel (colloquially called Old Hostel), Tagore Hostel & Annexe (collectively called the White Hostel), New Hostel and Lake View Hostel. Students with families are provided with separate family accommodation. However, PGP students are provided single boarding accommodation only. Preference is given to FPM & MBAEx (formerly PGPEX) students for hostel allotment. There are separate hostels for MBAEx (formerly PGPEX) and PGPEX-VLM programmes. Single accommodation for MBAEx (formerly PGPEX) students is arranged in Management Development Center (MDC). Students pursuing other courses are usually provided accommodation in the Tata Hall, the guest house in the campus.

Financial Research and Trading Lab
Established in November 2008, the Financial Research and Trading Lab at IIM Calcutta gives an opportunity to students and faculty members to test financial models with "live" information from the major markets of the world like India's National Stock Exchange, Multi Commodity Exchange, National Commodity and Derivatives Exchange, Bombay Stock Exchange and Bloomberg. The lab is the only one of its kind in India, and has advanced industry-standard equipment and facilities including 51 trading terminals, trading simulators and Bloomberg Terminals. The lab is aimed to help in academic programmes, research on financial markets, product design and testing, executive education and in organising international and national conferences on finance. The laboratory gives students hands-on experience in financial market data analysis and modelling and also helps in advanced applied research in financial markets.

New Campus

The New Campus is composed of two large "houses" each accommodating 175 students in private rooms with attached balconies. An Executive Centre with 200 suites and rooms, having training and syndicate rooms and well fitted executive dining and recreation areas is well under construction.

This new residential campus is connected to the existing campus via a steel bridge.

In the main campus, a new Academic wing was opened in early 2011 that accommodates amphitheater lecture halls, computer laboratories, incubation areas, faculty offices, class rooms and syndicate rooms on five levels.

The new campus plan and the new buildings are designed by the architect Christopher Charles Benninger of Pune, India.

Academics

Academic Groups and Centers of Excellence 

 Business Ethics and Communication Group
 Economics
 Human Resource Management
 Management Information Systems
 Marketing
 Operations Management
 Organizational Behavior
 Public Policy and Management
 Strategic Management

Rankings

Worldwide, the Financial Times has ranked IIM Calcutta 21 in its Masters in Management Ranking 2020 and 42 in its Global MBA Ranking 2020. The QS Global 250 MBA Rankings 2020 ranked it 79 in the world and 12 in Asia.

In India, IIM Calcutta was ranked third among management schools by the National Institutional Ranking Framework (NIRF) in 2022. It was ranked first in India by Business Todays "India's Top Five B-Schools Yearly Ranking In 2022" and third by Outlook Indias "Top 25 Public MBA Colleges in India" of 2022.

Accreditation 
IIM Calcutta was the first management school in India to complete triple accreditation by being recognized by three globally reputed b-school accreditation organizations: Association to Advance Collegiate Schools of Business (AACSB), European Quality Improvement System (EQUIS) and Association of MBAs (AMBA). It is also the only Indian business school that is a member of the Global Alliance in Management Education (CEMS).

Student life

Societies & Clubs
There are several student-run clubs at IIM Calcutta. Clubs usually have faculty members as guides and consultants, though they are actually managed by students. The following is a partial list of other clubs and Special Interest Groups on campus:
 Centre of Entrepreneurship and Innovation:  provides support for the creation of new business ventures by providing consulting services in evaluating opportunities, identifying resource requirements, helping in acquiring resources and managing new startups.
 Consulting Club: provides its members with opportunities to get involved in real-life consulting projects that would provide them hands-on experience in the consulting domain.
 Entrepreneurship Cell: Usually referred to as the E-Cell, the Entrepreneurship Cell at IIM Calcutta aims to support and encourage entrepreneurship. The E-Cell has strong ties to TiE and the National Entrepreneurship Network, a non-profit organisation that aims to create and support high-growth entrepreneurs in India.
 Finance & Investments Club: Popularly called the Fin Club, Finance & Investments Club collaborates with corporates and academia from the financial sector to provide a platform for students to improve their quantitative and analytical skills.
 Initiative for Community Action (INCA): INCA or INitiative for Community Action is an initiative of the students of the Indian Institute of Management Calcutta focused on social work and community action.
 OutTh!nk: OutTh!nk is a student club that focuses on puzzles and brain-teasers.
 Systems Consulting Club: provides a platform for prospective managers to gain experience with real-life issues and problems in technology-related areas.
 HUES Club: The Art club of IIM Calcutta, It organizes painting, sketching & creative workshops/events for students.
 Adventure Club: Organizes various activities like treks, hikes and camping trips for students.
 C'nema Paradiso: A club for movie enthusiasts.
 Choreo Club: The dance club of IIM Calcutta.
 Colloquia: Organizes talks, seminars and workshops by eminent personalities on various topics in the campus.
 DramCell: A club dedicated to Dramatics, organizes plays and dramas.
 JBS BaroC: The music club of IIM Calcutta, and also the official band of the institute.
 Lakeside Lens Lovers (LLL): The Photography club of IIM Calcutta.
 MarCell (Marketing Cell): Organizes various events and competitions related to Marketing.
 Persona: The literary club of IIM Calcutta. It publishes two magazines: Inquest and IMZine, and conducts various literary events and competitions in the campus.
 MAC Experiential Marketing Association: This club focuses on events related to Market research.
 Talent & Organizational Management Special Interest Group, focuses on HRM and BS

Student Exchange Programmes

IIM Calcutta has an extensive network of partner B-schools worldwide through which it conducts student exchange programmes. For the Post Graduate Programme, the student exchange programme (STEP) is usually held in the fifth term, between August–September and December. Every year during this period, more than a hundred students from IIM Calcutta leave for foreign institutes, and an equivalent number from various B-schools arrive in IIM Calcutta to spend the term there. Other academic programmes of IIM-C also offer exchange programmes.

Joka Times

Joka Times is the student-run online campus magazine-journal of IIM Calcutta. It serves as a one-stop site for the latest events, news and updates on IIM Calcutta, and showcases the student-life at IIM-C. Joka Times also hosts a forum, through which students applying for courses at IIM Calcutta are guided by existing students at the institute.

Events

Intaglio

Intaglio is the annual international Business school summit hosted by Indian Institute of Management Calcutta. The flagship event of IIM-C, it was started in 1992 as the National Business School Meet (NBSM), and is widely acknowledged to be the biggest B-school meet in India. Intaglio, usually held over a 3-day weekend in January, serves as a platform facilitating the interaction of eminent personalities from the industry, academia, media and government, holding conferences, workshops and seminars by experts in different fields on a wide range of topics. Intaglio also includes a large number of competitive and non-competitive events for B-school students, which attract participation from world-renowned institutions from around the world, like Asian Institute of Technology, Australian Graduate School of Management, CEIBS, ESCP Europe, Harvard Business School, other IIMs, London Business School, MIT Sloan, National University of Singapore, University of Toronto and the Wharton School. As a mark of its superior quality of events and processes, Intaglio in 2007 became the first event of its kind in India to achieve the ISO 9001:2000 certification from the International Organization for Standardization. In 2010, Intaglio got the distinction of being the first carbon-neutral B-school event in India.

The major regular events at Intaglio include:
 Olympus – the greatest leadership hunt: The flagship event of Intaglio in its recent editions, Olympus is a business leadership competition in which a single representative each from a few top B-schools compete against one another.
 Wizards Of Biz – the boardroom battle: A business simulation game.
 The Great Innovation Challenge: A competition that tests the business innovation and creative skills of participants.
 Consulting Knights: Co-sponsored by a Management consulting firm, this event exposes participants to real-life business situations, testing their consulting skills.

Carpe Diem

Carpe Diem is the annual cultural fest organised by the students of IIM Calcutta. It's usually held over a 3-day weekend in February and attracts participation from colleges and schools across India. It is the largest B-School Cultural Fest in Eastern India. In 2013, it had over 12,000 participants from 100+ colleges.

The major regular events at Carpe Diem are:
 Armageddon: Amateur Rock music competition.
 Symphony: Musical concert.
 Razzmatazz: Fashion show.
 Euphoria: Dance competition.

Lattice

Lattice is the annual business symposium organized by the MBAEx (formerly PGPEX) students of IIM Calcutta. It is a platform that facilitates interaction of students of IIM Calcutta with leaders of Indian society and industry. Lattice is usually held in October. It attracts guests from different spheres of Indian industry, society, IIM Calcutta alumnus, and students from different business schools. The event was started in year 2010.

7 Lakes Fest

7 Lakes Fest is the inaugural college fest to be held in December 2020 combining the legacy of 28 years of Intaglio (Business Summit), Carpe Diem (Cultural Fest), and 7 Lakes Run (Sports). Spread over three days, 7 Lakes Fest is the most prominent college fest of the Indian Institute of Management, Calcutta. It provides a platform for participants from Indian institutes to come together and showcase their talent in business skills, music, dance, quizzing, sports, creativity, theatre, and literary events.

Notable people

Alumni 

IIM Calcutta has a 15,000+ strong alumni network who have taken up careers in Management, Academy, Public service, Social Service around the world and made significant impact in the chosen areas. Every year the institute hosts Golden and Silver jubilee reunion. Since 2011 the institute has been awarding a Distinguished Alumni Award to alumni who have made immense contributions in the fields of Management, Academy, Public service, Social Service. Notable alumni include Krishnamurthy Subramanian, Ajit Balakrishnan, Sunil Duggal, Ramachandra Guha, Indra Nooyi, Shyam Srinivasan, Amish Tripathi, Gopal Vittal and Swami Mukundananda

Faculty and staff
See also :Category:Academic staff of the Indian Institute of Management Calcutta

Past and present faculty at IIM Calcutta include many prominent scholars such as management educationist Ravi J. Matthai, economists Paul Samuelson, Ashok Mitra, Yoginder K Alagh and Deepak Nayyar, statisticians Warren Bennis, Jagdish Sheth and Rahul Mukerjee, anthropologist Surajit Chandra Sinha, and historians Barun De and Rajat Kanta Ray.

References

 
Calcutta
Business schools in Kolkata
Educational institutions established in 1961
1961 establishments in West Bengal
Universities and colleges in South 24 Parganas district